In mathematics, the Quillen determinant line bundle is a line bundle over the space of Cauchy–Riemann operators of a vector bundle over a Riemann surface, introduced by . Quillen proved the existence of the Quillen metric on the determinant line bundle, a Hermitian metric defined using the analytic torsion of a family of differential operators.

See also
Quillen metric

References

Riemann surfaces
Vector bundles